Erich Palme (1894–1971) was a German film editor, producer and assistant director. He also directed several documentary films.

Selected filmography

Editor
 The Black Forest Girl (1933)
 Wild Cattle (1934)
 The Two Seals (1934)
 His Late Excellency (1935)
 A Strange Guest (1936)
 The Beaver Coat (1937)
 Doctor Crippen (1942)
 A Man Like Maximilian (1945)
 Mailman Mueller (1953)

Producer
 The Merciful Lie (1939)
 In the Temple of Venus (1948)

References

Bibliography 
 Langford, Michelle. Directory of World Cinema: Germany. Intellect Books, 2012.

External links 
 

1894 births
1971 deaths
Film people from Dresden